The levator veli palatini is the elevator muscle of the soft palate in the human body. It is supplied via the pharyngeal plexus. During swallowing, it contracts, elevating the soft palate to help prevent food from entering the nasopharynx.

Structure 
The levator veli palatini muscle is found in the soft palate of the mouth. It arises from the under surface of the apex of the petrous part of the temporal bone, and from the surface inferolateral to the medial lamina of the cartilage of the Eustachian tube. It does not connect with the medial lamina. It passes above the upper concave margin of the superior pharyngeal constrictor muscle. It spreads out in the palatine velum, its fibers extending obliquely downward and medially to the middle line, where they blend with those of the opposite side. It lies lateral to the choana.

Nerve supply 
The levator veli palatini muscle is supplied by the pharyngeal plexus, which is supplied by the vagus nerve (CN X).

Function 
The levator veli palatini muscle elevates the soft palate during swallowing. This helps to prevent food from entering the nasopharynx. Its action may be slightly slower than its partner, the tensor veli palatini muscle.

Additional images

References

External links
 

Muscles of the head and neck
Pharynx